The 2011–12 Air21 Express season was the first season of the franchise in the Philippine Basketball Association (PBA). The team, originally known as the Shopinas.com Clickers took over the original Barako Bull Energy Boosters franchise after it was sold to the Lina Group of Companies (which also owns the Air21 Express, renamed as Barako Bull starting this season) in July 2011. The team was renamed as Air21 Express before the start of the Commissioner's Cup.

Key dates
August 28: The 2011 PBA Draft took place in Robinson's Place Ermita, Manila.

Draft picks

Roster

Philippine Cup

Eliminations

Standings

Commissioner's Cup

Eliminations

Standings

Governors Cup

Eliminations

Standings

Transactions

Trades

Pre-season

Commissioner's Cup

Governors Cup

Additions

Subtractions

Recruited imports

References

Air21
Air21 Express seasons